Rémi Rossi (born 23 December 1995) is a Tahitian badminton player. He started playing badminton at the age of ten, coached by his father Patrick. In 2013, he went to France, studies engineering at Lyon University. His brother Léo Rossi also plays badminton for France which was the medalists at the European U17 Championships. In 2016, Rémi Rossi won silver medals at the Oceania Badminton Championships in men's singles event and men's doubles event partnered with Léo Cucuel. In the men's singles event he beat the No.1 and No.3 seeds Pit Seng Low and Anthony Joe before losing to Ashwant Gobinathan of Australia in the final round with the score 21–17, 21–16. In the men's doubles, he was partnered with Léo Cucuel, and the dou also defeated by the Australian pair Chau and Serasinghe in the straight set. Rossi also play for Badminton Club Oullins (Baco) in France. In 2019, he swept all three individual gold medals at the 2019 Samoa Pacific Games.

Achievements

Pacific Games 
Men's singles

Men's doubles

Mixed doubles

Oceania Championships 
Men's singles

Men's doubles

Pacific Mini Games 
Men's singles

Men's doubles

Mixed doubles

Oceania Junior Championships 
Boys' singles

Boys' doubles

References

External links 
 

Living people
1995 births
People from Grasse
Tahitian male badminton players
Sportspeople from Alpes-Maritimes